Aztekium ritteri is a species of cactus native to the Mexican state of Nuevo león It is one of the three confirmed species that make up the genus.

Blooming habits and reproduction
Aztekium ritteri blooms throughout the summer, producing an abundance of white and pink flowers measuring less than 10 mm in diameter. The main pollinators are likely bees native to the same area of Mexico. These flowers are followed by small pink fruit that open when ripe and release tiny black seeds.

Uses
In Mexico, Aztekium ritterii is sometimes called “Peyotillo.”  However this name is likely given to this plant not for its psychoactive properties, but rather for its vague similarity to the button like form of peyote (Lophophora williamsii). Even though it contains N-methyltyramine, hordenine, anhalidine, mescaline, pellotine, and 3-methoxytyramine, there have been no ethnobotanical reports that state that it has ever been used by the indigenous people of the area.

References

Cactoideae
Cacti of Mexico
Endemic flora of Mexico
Flora of Nuevo León